Sota.vision (SOTA) is a Russian independent news outlet. SOTA was started by a former reporter of Grani.ru, Alexandra Ageeva, who created her own YouTube channel to cover the most dramatic events involving Russian opposition activities in Moscow. These included rallies in support of Alexei Navalny, Bolotnaya Square case, and pickets condemning Russia's meddling in Ukraine.

History 
The website was launched in 2015 by Alexandra Ageeva and Oleg Elanchik, who later became its editor in chief. Later in 2015 SOTA was officially registered as a certified media outlet, and the company soon started its own social media accounts.

The site mainly covers protests inside the country. SOTA's biggest focus is the opposition agenda, both in the capital and beyond.

Sota.vision has a vast network of reporters operating not only in Moscow and Saint Petersburg, but the other regions of Russia.

The resource also collaborates with a large journalist pool stationed outside the country, for example, in Georgia, Latvia, Lithuania, Armenia, Kazakhstan, Poland, Ukraine and the USA. Its reporters cover mainly anti-military and protest themes related to Russia.

SOTA was the only media broadcasting global rallies in support of Alexey Navalny, which took place in more than 60 spots around the world.

Prosecution 
On the 26th of November 2021, Oleg Elanchik, chief editor, was proclaimed a foreign agent, a status close to extremism in modern Russia.

During a live broadcast on September 2022 from the streets in Moscow, Artem Kriger, a journalist at the SOTA news site, was given a draft summons after being arrested while covering anti-mobilisation protests in Moscow.

On February 11, 2022, Sota.vision founder Alexandra Ageeva also became a foreign agent.

In October 2022, acting editor in chief of the SOTA publication, politician Yevgeny Domozhirov, was put on the wanted list.

In January 2023 police in Moscow detained the two reporters Sota.vision while they reported on a local government meeting. Authorities accused the journalists of disrupting the meeting and charged them with disorderly conduct. Next day, a Moscow court ordered them both to be detained for 15 days. This is the maximum penalty under the Russian administrative code.

Breakup and crisis 
Because of plausible prosecution, Alexandra Ageeva took the decision to move to Riga. By this time SOTA had already gained over 300.000 followers and significantly extended its reporters’ network, with 40 people collaborating with the project.

In May 2022, Alexey Obukhov, a former employee, refused to return access to a number of resources of the publication, which was temporarily entrusted to him by the owner due to the move.

On May 28, 2022, a statement about the division of the editorial board appeared on the SOTA telegram channel. This unilateral statement was made after the owner, editor-in-chief and other employees were removed from the admins of the Telegram channel.

On June 19, 2022, a SOTA editorial statement «They didn't share the orange, it was just with ... shared» was published about the seizure of resources of the publication.

However, by the summer of 2022, SOTA partly regained its resources (except Telegram) with the aid of major social media companies like Twitter, TikTok, Facebook and new telegram.

References 

Websites
Russian news websites